Rohit Khandelwal (born 19 August 1995), is an Indian model, actor, television personality, winner of Mr India 2015 and the first ever Indian to be crowned Mister World in the 2016 contest.

Early life
Khandelwal was born in Hyderabad. He is a Marwari with family roots in Rajasthan. He is a graduate from Aurora Degree College and worked as a ground staff for SpiceJet and then as a technical support assistant for Dell Computers.

His first television advertisement was a jewellery advertisement with Kareena Kapoor.  Later he appeared in other advertisements.

He made his television show debut in episode 76 of Yeh Hai Aashiqui, an Indian television series that presented dramatisation of love stories and aired on Bindass.  Later he played role of Bhuvan, the leader of handloom weavers on the television series ‘’Million Dollar Girl’’, which was televised by Channel V. Growing up in Hyderabad, he was not fluent in Hindi so he had to take Hindi diction classes to learn the language.

In 2015, he won the Mr India 2015 contest held on 23 July 2015 at Club Royalty in Mumbai, Maharashta. He also won two special awards at the contest, "Stay-On Mr Active" and "Provogue Personal Care Best Actor".

In 2016, he passed down his Mr India crown to Vishnu Raj Menon who was announced as Mr India 2016 by Hrithik Roshan who attended as main guest to the gala event which was held in Mumbai.

Filmography

Films

Television

Music videos

Mr World 2016 
Khandelwal became the first Asian to win the title of Mister World on 19 July 2016 at Southport Theatre, Floral Hall, The Promenade, Southport. The competition saw 47 participants from around the world. Khandelwal received a cash prize of $50,000. He also competed for various sub-titles at the pageant, including Mr. World Multimedia Award, Mr. World Talent, Mobstar People's Choice Awards and Mr. World Sports Event, winning Mr. World Multimedia Award.

During his reign as Mister World, Rohit has travelled to Philippines, South Korea, South Africa, China, in addition to numerous trips to India and United Kingdom.

References

External links
 

1989 births
Living people
Marwari people
Mister World
Indian male models
Indian male television actors
Male actors from Hyderabad, India
Indian beauty pageant winners
Beauty pageant contestants from India
Male beauty pageant winners